Patrick Lebekwe (born 2 March 1973) is a Botswana former footballer who played as a defender. In 2001, he played one match for the Botswana national football team.

See also
Football in Botswana

References

External links

Association football defenders
Botswana footballers
Botswana international footballers
1973 births
Living people
Botswana Police XI SC players